Vardadzor is a village in the Gegharkunik Province of Armenia

Vardadzor  may also refer to:

 Vardadzor, Askeran, Askeran Province, Artsakh
 Vardadzor, Martakert, Martakert Province, Artsakh